The 2017 season is Helsingin Jalkapalloklubi's 109th competitive season. HJK are Finlands most successful football club in terms of titles, with 27 Finnish Championships, 12 Finnish Cup titles, 5 Finnish League Cup titles, one appearance in the UEFA Champions League group stages and one appearance in the UEFA Europa League group stages.

After finishing 2nd in the 2016 Veikkausliiga season, HJK entered the 2017–18 UEFA Europa League first qualifying round.

Season Review

Squad

On loan

Transfers

Winter

In:

Out:

Trial:

Summer

In:

Out:

Friendlies

Competitions

Veikkausliiga

League table

Results summary

Results by matchday

Results

Finnish Cup

Sixth Round

Knockout stage

UEFA Europa League

Qualifying rounds

Squad statistics

Appearances and goals

|-
|colspan="14"|Players from Klubi-04 who appeared:

|-
|colspan="14"|Players who left HJK during the season:

|-
|colspan="14"|Players away from the club on loan:

|}

Goal scorers

Disciplinary record

Notes

References

2017
HJK